Big Sage Reservoir is an artificial lake in Modoc County, California and Modoc National Forest.  Its waters are impounded by Big Sage Dam, which was completed in 1921.

Hydrology
The lake discharges into Rattlesnake Creek, a tributary of the Pit River.

Big Sage Dam
Hot Springs Valley Irrigation District owns the dam.

Recreation
Facilities include a campground and boat ramp, both located just north of the dam.

See also
 List of lakes in California
 List of dams and reservoirs in California

References

Modoc National Forest
Reservoirs in Modoc County, California
Reservoirs in California
Reservoirs in Northern California
1921 establishments in California